Sweetest Girl may refer to:

 "Sweetest Girl (Dollar Bill)", a 2007 song by Wyclef Jean
 "The "Sweetest Girl"", a 1981 song by Scritti Politti, covered by Madness in 1986
 The Sweetest Girl, a 1988 album by Sanchez 
 "The Sweetest Girl", a song by Pizzicato Five from the 1994 album Overdose
 "Sweetest Girl", a song by Eleanor Friedberger from the 2016 album New View
 "The Sweetest Girl", a 1992 single by The Mighty Asterix releasedc by Deepgrooves Entertainment